Leslie Whitfield Angus (8 November 1905 – 17 April 1974) was an Australian rules footballer who played with Collingwood in the Victorian Football League (VFL).

Notes

External links 

Les Angus's profile at Collingwood Forever

1905 births
1974 deaths
Australian rules footballers from Victoria (Australia)
Collingwood Football Club players